The Men's 100 metre freestyle event at the 2002 Commonwealth Games was held on 1 and 2 August at the Manchester Aquatics Centre.

Records
Prior to this competition, the existing world record was as follows;

The following records were established during the competition:

Results

Heats
The 16 fastest swimmers in the heats qualified for the semifinals.

Semifinals
The eight fastest swimmers from the semifinals progressed to the final.

Semifinal 1

Semifinal 2

Final
The final was held on 2 August at 19:25.

References

Men's 100 metre freestyle
Commonwealth Games